"No Social Media" is a song written and performed by American hip hop recording artists Wiz Khalifa and Snoop Dogg. It was released on September 8, 2015. It was produced by I.D. Labs and Shod Beatz, and samples "Main Theme" by Kenji Kawai from the Higurashi When They Cry soundtrack.

Commercial performance 
"No Social Media" debuted at number 9 on the Billboard Twitter Top Tracks chart dated September 26, 2015.

References

2015 singles
2015 songs
Wiz Khalifa songs
Snoop Dogg songs
Atlantic Records singles
Songs written by Snoop Dogg
Songs written by Wiz Khalifa